Fen Tigers may refer to:

People
 Eric Boon (1919–1981), a British lightweight boxing champion from Chatteris, Cambridgeshire, England
 Peter Evison (born 1964), an English professional darts player
 Dave Boy Green (1953), a British welterweight boxing champion from Chatteris, Cambridgeshire, England

Other uses
 Mildenhall Fen Tigers, a motorcycle speedway team from Mildenhall, Suffolk, England.
 Men who tried to prevent the draining of The Fens in the 1600s
 The Cambridgeshire Regiment and its successor D (Cambridgeshire) Coy, 6 (Vol) Bn, Royal Anglian Regiment
 The Fen Tiger, a 1963 novel by British author Catherine Marchant (Catherine Cookson)
 A British big cat first reported in 1982 in Cambridgeshire